María José Goyanes Muñoz (born 8 December 1948) is a Spanish actress.

Biography
María José Goyanes belongs to a family with a long artistic tradition: her grandfather was the actor , her mother the actress , and her sisters Vicky Lagos, and  Goyanes. She was married to the producer and theater director . Their son, is also an actor.

She also made her debut in cinema and television when she was not yet 15. A dedicated theatrical actress, she formed her own company, staging works such as Chekhov's The Seagull.

Goyanes was the subject of a scandal during the 1975 production of the play Equus.

Her first big-screen appearance was in 1960's A Ray of Light by Luis Lucia, which also marked the debut of the prodigy Marisol.

She is also known for acting in the series  (1988),  with Concha Velasco (1996), Yo soy Bea as Alicia Echegaray (2008–2009), and Hospital Central. In 2016 and 2017 she played Ana María, marquise of Madrigales, in Amar es para siempre.

Awards
 Nominated for the Mayte Theater Award (1984)
 Nominated for the Mayte Theater Award (1985)
 Nominated for the Mayte Theater Award (1987)

Selected plays

Television appearances

References

External links

 

1948 births
20th-century Spanish actresses
21st-century Spanish actresses
Actresses from Madrid
Living people
Spanish child actresses
Spanish stage actresses
Spanish television actresses